The 2011 Silk Way Rally is the third running of the event. The event started in Moscow, Russia, on July 10, and ran through Russia to finish in Sochi on July 16.

Stages

Final standings

Cars

Trucks

References

External links
 

Silk Way Rally
Silk Way
Silk Way